Trzeciewiec Transmitter (RTCN Trzeciewiec) - is a 320 metre tall guyed steel mast, located in Trzeciewiec, Bydgoszcz County, Poland. It was built in 1962 for broadcasting radio and television. It was used by Kuyavian-Pomeranian Voivodeship.

History

Residents of the Bydgoszcz Voivodeship established the tower. In 1957 a Social Committee was organized to build Pomerania Television Centre in Bydgoszcz. In 1958 the central management Board of the Radio station and Television in Warsaw approved the concept of the tower 20 kilometers from Bydgoszcz, in the vicinity of Trzeciewiec village. Construction began in 1960 and was finished in 1962. The transmitting apparatus was from the Czech company Tesla.

Transmitted Programmes

FM Radio

Digital Television MPEG-4

See also
 List of masts

References

External links
 
 
 
 

Radio masts and towers in Poland
Bydgoszcz County
1962 establishments in Poland
Towers completed in 1962